Shiraki (written:  or ) is a Japanese surname. Notable people with the surname include:

, Japanese jazz drummer and bandleader
, Japanese actress
, Japanese writer

Fictional characters
Meiko Shiraki, a character in the manga series Prison School

See also
Shirah Ki, a village in Salmas County, West Azerbaijan Province, Iran

Japanese-language surnames